A broker is a person or firm who arranges transactions between a buyer and a seller for a commission when the deal is executed. A broker who also acts as a seller or as a buyer becomes a principal party to the deal. Neither role should be confused with that of an agent—one who acts on behalf of a principal party in a deal.

Definition
A broker is an independent party whose services are used extensively in some industries. A broker's prime responsibility is to bring sellers and buyers together and thus a broker is the third-person facilitator between a buyer and a seller. An example would be a real estate or  stock broker who facilitates the sale of a property.

Brokers can furnish market research and market data. Brokers may represent either the seller or the buyer but generally not both at the same time. Brokers are expected to have the tools and resources to reach the largest possible base of buyers and sellers. They then screen these potential buyers or sellers for the perfect match. An individual producer, on the other hand, especially one new in the market, probably will not have the same access to customers as a broker. Another benefit of using a broker is cost—they might be cheaper in smaller markets, with smaller accounts, or with a limited line of products.<ref name=Spiro>{{cite book | url=https://books.google.com/books?id=kamlQgAACAAJ | last1=Spiro | first1=Rosann L. | first2=William J. | last2=Stanton | first3=Gregory A. | last3=Rich | title=Management of a Sales Force. 12th ed. | publisher=McGraw-Hill/Irwin | year=2003| isbn=9780256020465 }}</ref>

Some brokers, known as discount brokers, charge smaller commission, sometimes in exchange for offering less advice or services than full service brokerage firms.

A broker-dealer is a broker that transacts for its own account, in addition to facilitating transactions for clients.

Brokerage firms are generally subject to regulations based on the type of brokerage and jurisdictions in which they operate. Examples of brokerage firm regulatory agencies include the U.S. Securities and Exchange Commission and the Financial Industry Regulatory Authority (FINRA), which regulate stockbrokers in the United States.

Etymology
The word "broker" derives from Old French broceur "small trader", of uncertain origin, but possibly from Old French brocheor meaning "wine retailer", which comes from the verb brochier, or  "to broach (a keg)".

Types of brokers

 Automobile broker
 Broker-dealer
 Business broker
 Shipping agency
 Auto transport broker
 Commodity broker
 Corredor Público
 Customs broker
 Freight broker
 Information broker (data broker)
 Insurance broker
 Intellectual property broker
 Joint venture broker
 List broker
 Matchmaking
 Message broker
 Mortgage broker
 Pawnbroker
 Power broker (term)
 Prime brokerage
 Real estate broker
 Shipbroking
 Sponsorship broker
 Stockbroker
 Office broker
 Yacht broker

References

Further reading
 Ronald S. Burt. 2004. “Structural Holes and Good Ideas.” American Journal of Sociology'', Vol. 110, No. 2, pp. 349-399

External links
 

Financial services occupations